{{Infobox school
|name                  = Highgate School
|image                 = Highgate crest.jpg
|image_size            = 150px
|caption         = Coat of arms of the Highgate School
|motto                 = {{Unbulleted list|Altiora in Votis|(Latin: 'Higher through prayer')}}
|type                  = 
|religious_affiliation = Church of England
|established           = 
|founder               = Sir Roger Cholmeley
|head_label            = Head
|head                  = Adam Pettitt
|address               = North Road
|city                  = London
|country               = England
|postcode              = N6 4AY
|local_authority       = London Borough of Haringey
|coordinates           = 
|dfeno                 = 309/6001
|urn                   = 102163
|staff                 = 126 full-time
|enrolment             = 1,456 pupils
|gender                = Mixed
|lower_age             = 3
|upper_age             = 18
|colours               =   Maroon, navy 
|free_label_1          = Affiliations
|free_1                = HMC, IAPS, Eton Group
|free_label_2          = Former pupils
|free_2                = Old Cholmeleians
|website               = 
}}

Highgate School, formally Sir Roger Cholmeley's School at Highgate, is a co-educational, fee-charging, private day school, founded in 1565 in Highgate, London, England. It educates over 1,400 pupils in three sections – Highgate Pre-Preparatory School (ages 4–7), Highgate junior school (ages 7–11) and the senior school (11+) – which together comprise the Highgate Foundation. As part of its wider work the charity was from 2010 a founding partner of the London Academy of Excellence and it is now also the principal education sponsor of an associated Academy, the London Academy of Excellence Tottenham, which opened in September 2017. The principal business sponsor is Tottenham Hotspur FC. The charity also funds the Chrysalis Partnership, a scheme supporting 26 state schools in six London boroughs.

Administration
The foundation is governed in accordance with a Charity Commission Scheme dated 1 September 2005 (and amended in 2014). Its governing body consists of 16 members; four are nominated (one each by the universities of Oxford and London, by the Bishop of London, and by the Lord Chief Justice), and the rest are co-opted. The Visitor is Queen Elizabeth II. The head is assisted by principals of the pre-prep and junior schools, by deputy heads and a bursar, in managing the foundation. The school is a member of HMC and IAPS and is one of the twelve schools of the Eton Group.

History
Cholmeley, a former Chief Justice and local landowner, decided to found a charitable school "for the good education and instruction of boys and young men" in Highgate and the local parishes. On 27 April 1565 he was granted by Edmund Grindal, the Bishop of London, some land on the site of the old gatehouse to the Bishop's Park and Hermit's Chapel (opposite the Gatehouse Inn, which still exists). A new chapel and buildings for the school and the local curate, who was expected to be the teacher, were built. The chapel also served as a chapel of ease for Highgate residents.

However, by the early nineteenth century a dispute arose because the charity was spending more money, and the curate more time, on the local chapel than on the pupils. A House of Commons commission visited in 1819 and found the master, Samuel Mence, was paying a sexton to teach the boys. In a long and bitter action brought in the High Court against the trustees it was contended that this was contrary to its founding charitable deed. Lord Chancellor Eldon, in his 1827 judgment, agreed, finding "the charity is for the sustenance and maintenance of a free Grammar school". The trustees were forced to comply and a separate local church for Highgate, St Michael's, was built in South Grove after a successful local appeal. Mence struggled on at the school until 1838 when there were only 19 pupils.

An expansion of the school occurred under the next headmaster John Bradley Dyne (Fellow of Wadham College, Oxford) between 1838 and 1874. Under Dyne, by the 1870s the school had largely dropped free provision for local parish boys and alongside the day places boarding was encouraged for boys from the upper and upper middle classes; fees were introduced and academic standards improved. In the period up to this time the school was known commonly as the Free Grammar School at Highgate, the Highgate Grammar School, or the Cholmeley School. Like other public schools, Highgate followed Arnold at Rugby School in introducing the house system. Also like other public schools, Dyne flogged the pupils with a birch rod.

In the 1860s land was acquired in Bishopswood Road, which provided extensive sports fields and on which several boarding houses and private residences were built. During this period the current chapel and main buildings were erected, designed by Reginald Blomfield (who had also designed Lady Margaret Hall, Oxford). A fragment of the older school building, a gateway with a rusted bell mechanism above between the porter's lodge and the main school building, remained intact until 2006 when the bell was refurbished and the old entrance itself rebuilt in a more modern style. The senior school continues to occupy today the island site in Highgate Village on which it was founded.

When J. A. H. Johnston was appointed as headmaster in 1908, he found a school with a strong focus on a classical education. He created fifth and sixth forms for science, in which the main subjects were chemistry, physics, biology, and astronomy. In 1928 came the opening of a new Science Building by Sir Samuel Hoare, Secretary of State for Air, and Johnston then introduced aeronautics as a school subject, acquiring a Sopwith Snipe and an Avro 504K biplane.

The poet Samuel Taylor Coleridge was originally buried in the school chapel. In 1961 there was a ceremonial disinterring of Coleridge at which the then Poet Laureate John Masefield spoke and the remains were reburied at St Michael's parish church just a few hundred yards away.

Until recently the school had two blocks of Eton Fives courts, one structure with ten courts (of which six were built in 1899 and a further four added c.1913); a second block of eight courts constructed in the 1920s was removed in 2014.

Boarding and weekly boarding at Highgate declined in the years up to the early 1990s when the last boarders left. In 1993 one of the former houses was converted to create the coeducational pre-preparatory school.

In 2001 the school announced its intention to become fully co-educational ending over four hundred years of single sex education, and girls joined the Senior and Junior schools from 2004. According to the Good Schools Guide "Its decision to go co-ed has helped to put its popularity and academic standards on upward trajectories".

In January 2013 the charter building was opened by former pupil and governor Lord Hill.

In May 2014 the Sir Martin Gilbert Library was opened by former Prime Minister Gordon Brown.

Throughout 2015 the school celebrated its 450th anniversary. In January 2015 a museum opened, which can be visited by the public on Saturday mornings in term-time.

In September 2016 a new building for the junior school opened.

Sexual abuse allegations 

In March 2021, current and former pupils of the school published an open letter to the governors, evidencing the school's 'systematic failure' to address sexual abuse committed by Highgate pupils or on Highgate property. The letter referenced hundreds of anonymous allegations of harassment, assault, and rape against former and current pupils, claimed that male students at Highgate School had a widespread reputation for such behaviour, and alleged that students had been 'silenced' by the school administration. Year 11, 12 and 13 pupils staged a classroom walkout to mark the report. Later the same week the school announced an independent investigation into rape culture at the school, by a panel to led by Dame Anne Rafferty, the former Lady Justice of Appeal. Her subsequent report along with a safeguarding review carried out by the London Borough of Haringey stated that the school's polices met statutory requirements and that a large majority of alleged incidents took place outside of the school. In addition, both reports reflected on the contrasting responses from interviews with pupils and parents with Rafferty stating: "It is striking that no one in the school community recognises the Highgate on Everyone’s Invited as the school they attend or to which they send their children or at which they work." The school announced a range of policy reviews including an Anti-Sexism and Sexual Violence Plan along with implementing Rafferty's recommendation of appointing a dedicated Director of Safeguarding.

Houses

The school operates a house system like many other public schools and upon reaching year 9, pupils are placed in a house. These houses are Northgate, Southgate, Westgate, Eastgate, Queensgate, Kingsgate, Midgate, Fargate, Heathgate, The Lodge, School House and Grindal. This system, which Dyne, like other public school headmasters, copied from Arnold's at Rugby School, was established to create "house spirit" among the students, allowing for both academic and sporting competitions among the houses. Some of these, like School House, Grindal and The Lodge used to be boarding houses. However, other houses, such as Kingsgate, are newer, having been created by a disaffected group of Westgateans in the 1970s.

Head masters
The title head has been used since March 2015. 

Notable members of staff
With year of joining

The Cholmeleian Society and notable Cholmeleians

Former pupils of Highgate School are called Cholmeleians or Old Cholmeleians ("OCs"), after Sir Roger Cholmeley.  The alumni are organised as the Cholmeleian Society, founded as the Old Cholmeleian Club in 1893, although annual dinners had been held since 1859. Both the School and the Society organise social events, and a magazine, The Cholmeleian'', is published twice a year.  Notable Cholmeleians include:

Arts, design and literature

Business and commerce

Classical music

Film, stage and television

Law

Military

Politics and public service

Popular music

Religion

Science and engineering

Sport

References

External links
 Highgate School website
 The Cholmeleian Society

1565 establishments in England
Educational institutions established in the 1560s
Highgate
Private co-educational schools in London
Private schools in the London Borough of Haringey
Member schools of the Headmasters' and Headmistresses' Conference
Preparatory schools in London
Schools with a royal charter